Palmetto High School is a high school in Williamston, South Carolina, United States. It serves an average of about 900 students.

Academy
Ninth graders are placed in the Freshman Academy, separating them from the rest of the student body for their core classes. The Academy's courses include English II Honors, Biology Honors, A.P. Human Geography, and Geometry Honors.

Athletics
Palmetto's athletic teams are known as the Mustangs.

State championships 
 Baseball: 1985, 1987
 Competitive Cheer: 2005, 2016, 2017, 2018
 Cross Country - Boys: 2000
 Cross Country - Girls: 2016
 Football: 1970
 Golf - Boys: 1990, 1992
 Softball: 2012

Notable alumni 
 Derek Watson, former National Football League running back

References

External links 
 

Public high schools in South Carolina
Schools in Anderson County, South Carolina